"As Far As I'm Concerned" is a song written by Dale Parker, performed by Red Foley and Betty Foley, and released on the Capitol label (catalog no. 21226). In March 1954, it peaked at No. 8 on the Billboard country and western chart. It was also ranked No. 24 on Billboards 1954 year-end country and western retail chart.

See also
 Billboard Top Country & Western Records of 1954

References

Red Foley songs
1954 songs